Bryan Clauson (June 15, 1989 – August 7, 2016) was an American professional auto racing driver. Best known for his achievements in dirt track open-wheel racing, such as USAC Silver Crown, Midget and Sprint cars. Bryan was seen more and more competing with the World of Outlaws (WoO) sprint cars in his last couple of years. Clauson was a dirt track icon who also competed in the NASCAR Nationwide Series, Indy Lights, and IndyCar Series and was a development driver for Chip Ganassi Racing.

In 2016, Clauson attempted to compete in 200 races including the Indianapolis 500, World of Outlaws sprint cars, wingless sprint cars, and midget cars. On August 6, 2016, Clauson was involved in a midget car crash at Belleville High Banks Speedway in Belleville, Kansas, and died the following night.

In 2018 Bryan was elected into the National Sprint Car Hall of Fame. The facility also built the Bryan Clauson Tower with fan donations overlooking turn 2 at the famed Knoxville Raceway.  The Indianapolis Motor Speedway's new infield dirt track conducts a 39-lap USAC Midget race in his memory starting in 2018.

Racing career
Born in Sacramento, California, Clauson made his USAC National Sprint Series debut just two days after his 16th birthday on June 17, 2005, at Limaland Motorsports Park, Ohio garnering a third place podium finish. On October 8, 2005, Clauson won the Open Wheel Oktoberfest Midget race at Columbus Motor Speedway, Ohio, becoming the youngest driver in USAC history to win a National feature event, aged . On August 12, 2006, Clauson recorded a historic USAC Sprint/Midget doubleheader "sweep" at Salem Speedway, Indiana winning both the 30-lap Midget race and 50-lap Sprint race held the same night, only the 24th such sweep in USAC history.

On August 31, Clauson scored his first career ARCA win at the Gateway International Raceway. Two months later he began competing in the NASCAR Busch Series, driving the No. 41 Memorex Dodge Charger for Chip Ganassi. He competed full-time during the 2007 season in the USAC National Sprint and Midget Series as part of the Keith Kunz Motorsports stable.

Despite his move to NASCAR, Clauson returned to his dirt-track roots on January 12, racing in the Chili Bowl, an indoor Midget race in Tulsa, Oklahoma, featuring some of the top names in racing, such as Jeff Gordon, Tony Stewart, Kasey Kahne, Jason Leffler, Gary Scelzi, Cruz Pedregon, Bobby Santos III, Brett Hearn and Tim McCreadie. After starting the feature mid-pack, he finished fourth overall.

In 2008, Clauson started the season in the No. 41 Polaroid/Texaco Havoline Dodge for Ganassi in the Nationwide Series, but was replaced by Kyle Krisiloff. He then drove the No. 40 Fastenal entry for Ganassi, filling in for Dario Franchitti in select races. He won his 1st pole at Daytona in July, but was replaced full-time by Franchitti the week after.

He was set to make his Cup debut at the Bank of America 500 at Lowe's Motor Speedway driving the No. 40 Target/MotorStorm: Pacific Rift Dodge but qualifying was rained out and the team, which did not have enough owner points, did not qualify. His second attempt at his Cup Series debut ended the same way at Atlanta Motor Speedway. Qualifying was rained out for the race on October 26, 2008; he would have driven the No. 40 Guitar Hero World Tour Dodge. In his first actual attempt at Texas, Clauson failed to qualify.

Clauson was supposed to drive the No. 40 in the Nationwide Series full-time in 2009, but the team shut down after the team merged with Dale Earnhardt, Inc. and CGR's Nationwide program was shut down, The No. 40 car's sponsor, Fastenal, would also leave the team for JR Motorsports. Clauson was not able to find a ride with another NASCAR team for 2009, and he did not end up returning to the sport at all after his release from Earnhardt Ganassi, so he returned to dirt racing. He won the Turkey Night Grand Prix in November.

Clauson joined the Tony Stewart Racing Silver Crown team in USAC 2010. During this season he was successful in winning the USAC National Midget championship for his own team, as well as the first-ever USAC National Drivers championship. Clauson earned a $300,000 scholarship to compete in all six Indy Lights oval races in 2011.

Clauson ran the 2012 Indianapolis 500 with Sarah Fisher Hartman Racing, but finished 30th with mechanical problems.

Clauson won the USAC Sprint Car Championship in 2012, and repeated in 2013.

Following the 2013 season, Clauson replaced Jerry Coons Jr. in the Joe Dooling/Rusty Kunz number 63 Westin Packaged Meats Esslinger powered Midget. On January 18, 2014, he won the Chili Bowl Nationals at the Tulsa Expo Center, while teammate Michael Pickens, driving the number 63 Dooling Machine, Esslinger powered midget, flipped with 11 to go.  Later that year, the Gold Crown Nationals at Eldora Speedway were postponed after a 5-hour rain delay, the next day they resumed racing and he led all 25 laps of the race for his first Gold Crown Midget win, holding off Christopher Bell in the No. 71 KKM midget.

Clauson returned to the Indy 500 in 2015, driving for the KV Racing Technology/Jonathan Byrd's Racing team, finishing 31st after an accident while moving out of the way for a faster car. He also competed in the "Kokomo Classic" at Kokomo Speedway later that evening, where he finished 2nd to Kevin Thomas, Jr. in a photo finish.

Clauson was attempting to compete in 200 races in 2016 which is being billed as "The Chasing 200 Tour, Circular Insanity". The tour included the 100th Indianapolis 500, USAC Midget and Sprint cars, World of Outlaws (WoO) sprint cars, and wingless sprint cars. He normally ran about 150 shows per year; he hoped to double up by racing some 360 wingless sprint car class cars at 410 (WoO / USAC) winged sprint car events. Clauson traveled the country living out of a mobile home. The IndyCar Series announced during its series banquet on October 4, 2016, that Clauson was named INDYCAR Nation Fan Favorite driver as voted on by the fans.

Death and legacy

Death

On August 6, 2016, Clauson was competing in the Belleville Nationals midget race – his 116th race of the year – when he was involved in an accident in which he flipped his car after making contact with a lapped car and was hit by another. He was taken to Bryan Medical Center West and was in critical condition upon arrival. Clauson died at the hospital the following evening.

Tony Stewart remarked, "It sucks when it's anybody in racing. It's hard when you lose them, but it's even worse when they're somebody as close to you as Bryan was. I feel for Bryan's parents and his sister, and I hope to be able to see them soon, but just thinking about them more than anything right now."

Clauson was a registered organ donor, which contributed to five lives being saved.

Various tributes from the racing community were made in honor of Clauson. For the Xfinity Series race at Mid-Ohio Sports Car Course, drivers ran a BC decal on the A-post of their cars, while race winner Justin Marks dedicated his victory to Clauson. The following week, at the Cup Series' Bass Pro Shops NRA Night Race, Ricky Stenhouse Jr. ran a Fastenal scheme modeled after Clauson's 2008 Nationwide Series car, Stenhouse finished in a then career-best 2nd place. And on May 28, 2017, at the 100 lap of the Indianapolis 500 race, the video board located at the start-finish line displayed a commemorative green image with the legend #BCFOREVER on it.

Legacy
The Bryan Clauson Classic, known as the Driven2SaveLives BC39 presented by NOS Energy for commercial reasons, is held during the NASCAR meeting at the Indianapolis Motor Speedway.  This event promotes organ donation through registration, and carries his car number, 39, as the race distance. It is a two-night United States Auto Club NOS Midget Championship race.  Originally run for the 25th Brickyard 400, the event was moved to the week after the NASCAR meeting in 2021 in order to avoid a date clash with the Knoxville Nationals.

In 2018, Clauson was elected on the first ballot into the National Sprint Car Hall of Fame.

On May 19, 2021, the NTT IndyCar Series announced that the driver who qualifies on pole for the inaugural Big Machine Music City Grand Prix in Nashville, Tennessee, will receive the Bryan Clauson Trophy, awarded to highlight the event's partnership with Tennessee Donor Services to raise awareness for organ and tissue donation.  The race sponsor, Big Machine Label Group, was Clauson's sponsor.

Personal life
Clauson attended Noblesville High School in Noblesville, Indiana. He is survived by his parents Tim and Diana Clauson and sister Taylor. He left behind his fiancée Lauren Stewart and their dogs, Chevy and Stewart.

Racing record

American open-wheel racing results
(key)

Indy Lights

IndyCar Series

Indianapolis 500

NASCAR
(key) (Bold – Pole position awarded by qualifying time. Italics – Pole position earned by points standings or practice time. * – Most laps led.)

Sprint Cup Series

Nationwide Series

ARCA Re/Max Series
(key) (Bold – Pole position awarded by qualifying time. Italics – Pole position earned by points standings or practice time. * – Most laps led.)

Sprint Car & Midget Racing

Chili Bowl Results

References

External links

1989 births
2016 deaths
Racing drivers from Indianapolis
Indianapolis 500 drivers
IndyCar Series drivers
Indy Lights drivers
NASCAR drivers
Filmed deaths in motorsport
Sports deaths in Kansas
Racing drivers who died while racing
People from Carmichael, California
Organ transplant donors
ARCA Menards Series drivers
Chip Ganassi Racing drivers
USAC Silver Crown Series drivers
Sarah Fisher Racing drivers
Arrow McLaren SP drivers